Brzozowo may refer to the following places:
Brzozowo, Kuyavian-Pomeranian Voivodeship (north-central Poland)
Brzozowo, Kolno County in Podlaskie Voivodeship (north-east Poland)
Brzozowo, Sokółka County in Podlaskie Voivodeship (north-east Poland)
Brzozowo, Pomeranian Voivodeship (north Poland)
Brzozowo, Warmian-Masurian Voivodeship (north Poland)
Brzozowo, Gmina Nowogard in West Pomeranian Voivodeship (north-west Poland)
Brzozowo, Gmina Przybiernów in West Pomeranian Voivodeship (north-west Poland)